Daniel Mearns (1838–1913) was a Scottish shipping merchant who served as Lord Provost of Aberdeen.

Life
He was the youngest son of Daniel Mearns a shipmaster of the barque "Helen", named after his wife, Helen Adam. He was apprenticed as a ships chandler with P Buyers at Regent Quay in Aberdeen.

He entered Aberdeen City Council in 1876, also joining the Aberdeen Harbour Board and Scottish Fishery Board. He was Scottish consul to Argentina and a Governor of Robert Gordon's College.

In 1895 he was elected Lord Provost of Aberdeen. During his time as provost he campaigned for the first Aberdeen tramway and enlarged the main market. He was succeeded in 1898 by John Fleming.

In 1900 he was created Deputy Lieutenant of Aberdeen.

He died on 12 February 1913.

References
 

1838 births
1913 deaths
People from Aberdeen
Lord Provosts of Aberdeen
Deputy Lieutenants of Aberdeen